Getavan may refer to:
Getavan, Armenia
Getavan, Azerbaijan